The economic results of migration impact the economies of both the sending and receiving countries.

Economic impact on natives 
According to David Card, Christian Dustmann, and Ian Preston, "most existing studies of the economic impacts of immigration suggest these impacts are small, and on average benefit the native population". In a survey of the existing literature, Örn B Bodvarsson and Hendrik Van den Berg write, "a comparison of the evidence from all the studies... makes it clear that, with very few exceptions, there is no strong statistical support for the view held by many members of the public, namely that immigration has an adverse effect on native-born workers in the destination country."

Studies show small but more mixed results (negative, positive or no impact), for low-skilled natives.

Research also suggests that cultural diversity has a net positive effect on the productivity of natives. A literature review of the economic impacts of immigration finds that the net fiscal impact of migrants varies across studies but that the most credible analyses typically find small and positive fiscal effects on average. According to the authors, "the net social impact of an immigrant over his or her lifetime depends substantially and in predictable ways on the immigrant's age at arrival, education, reason for migration, and similar". Studies of refugees' impact on native welfare are scant but the existing literature shows mixed results (negative, positive and no significant effects on native welfare).

Research on the economic effects of undocumented immigrants is even more scant but existing studies suggests that the effects are positive for the native population. A 2015 study shows that "increasing deportation rates and tightening border control weakens low-skilled labor markets, increasing unemployment of native low-skilled workers. Legalization, instead, decreases the unemployment rate of low-skilled natives and increases income per native."

United States
A survey of economists shows a consensus behind the view that high-skilled immigration makes the average American better off. A survey of the same economists also shows strong support behind the notion that low-skilled immigration makes the average American better off.

Overall immigration has not had much effect on native wage inequality but low-skill immigration has been linked to greater income inequality in the native population.  According to labor economist Giovanni Peri, the existing literature suggests that there are no economic reasons why the American labor market could not easily absorb 100,000 Syrian refugees in a year.

Impact on the migrants and global poverty 
Research suggests that migration is beneficial both to the receiving and sending countries. According to one study, welfare increases in both types of countries: "welfare impact of observed levels of migration is substantial, at about 5% to 10% for the main receiving countries and about 10% in countries with large incoming remittances". Studies show that the elimination of barriers to migration would have profound effects on world GDP, with estimates of gains ranging between 67 and 147%. According to Branko Milanovic, country of residency is by far the most important determinant of global income inequality, which suggests that the reduction in labor barriers would significantly reduce global income inequality. A study of equivalent workers in the United States and 42 developing countries found that "median wage gap for a male, unskilled (9 years of schooling), 35 year-old, urban formal sector worker born and educated in a developing country is P$15,400 per year at purchasing power parity". A 2014 survey of the existing literature on emigration finds that a 10 percent emigrant supply shock would increase wages in the sending country by 2–5.5%. According to economists Michael Clemens and Lant Pratchett, "permitting people to move from low-productivity places to high-productivity places appears to be by far the most efficient generalized policy tool, at the margin, for poverty reduction". A successful two-year in situ anti-poverty program, for instance, helps poor people make in a year what is the equivalent of working one day in the developed world. Research on a migration lottery that allowed Tongans to move to New Zealand found that the lottery winners saw a 263% increase in income from migrating (after only one year in New Zealand) relative to the unsuccessful lottery entrants. A longer-term study on the Tongan lottery winners finds that they "continue to earn almost 300 percent more than non-migrants, have better mental health, live in households with more than 250 percent higher expenditure, own more vehicles, and have more durable assets". A conservative estimate of their lifetime gain to migration is NZ$315,000 in net present value terms (approximately US$237,000). A slight reduction in the barriers to labor mobility between the developing and developed world would do more to reduce poverty in the developing world than any remaining trade liberalization.

Impact on trade and innovation 
Research also finds that migration leads to greater trade in goods and services. Using 130 years of data on historical migrations to the United States, one study finds "that a doubling of the number of residents with ancestry from a given foreign country relative to the mean increases by 4.2 percentage points the probability that at least one local firm invests in that country, and increases by 31% the number of employees at domestic recipients of FDI from that country. The size of these effects increases with the ethnic diversity of the local population, the geographic distance to the origin country, and the ethno-linguistic fractionalization of the origin country." Mass migration can also boost innovation and growth, as shown by the Huguenot diaspora in Prussia, German Jewish emigration to the United States. Immigrants have been linked to greater invention and innovation in the U.S. Research also shows that labor migration increases human capital. Foreign doctoral students are a major source of innovation in the American economy.

Impact on the sending country

Remittances increase living standards in the country of origin. Remittances are a large share of the GDP of many developing countries. A study on remittances to Mexico found that remittances lead to a substantial increase in the availability of public services in Mexico, surpassing government spending in some localities.

Research finds that emigration and low migration barriers has net positive effects on human capital formation in the sending countries. There was found to be a "brain gain", instead of a "brain drain", because of emigration.

One study finds that sending countries benefit indirectly in the long run on the emigration of skilled workers because those skilled workers are able to innovate more in developed countries, which the sending countries are able to benefit on as a positive externality. Greater emigration of skilled workers consequently leads to greater economic growth and welfare improvements in the long-run. The negative effects of high-skill emigration remain largely unfounded. According to economist Michael Clemens, it has not been shown that restrictions on high-skill emigration reduce shortages in the countries of origin.

Research also suggests that emigration, remittances and return migration can have a positive impact on political institutions and democratization in the country of origin. Research also shows that remittances can lower the risk of civil war in the country of origin. Return migration from countries with liberal gender norms has been associated with the transfer of liberal gender norms to the home country.

Research suggests that emigration causes an increase in the wages of those who remain in the country of origin. A 2014 survey of the existing literature on emigration finds that a 10 percent emigrant supply shock would increase wages in the sending country by 2–5.5%. A study of emigration from Poland shows that it led to a slight increase in wages for high- and medium-skilled workers for remaining Poles. A 2013 study finds that emigration from Eastern Europe after the 2004 EU enlargement increased the wages of remaining young workers in the country of origin by 6%, while it had no effect on the wages of old workers. The wages of Lithuanian men increased as a result of emigration after the Lithuanian accession to the European Union in 2004. Return migration is associated with greater household firm revenues.

Some research shows that the remittance effect is not strong enough to make the remaining natives in countries with high emigration flows better off.

It has been argued that high-skill emigration causes labour shortages in the country of origin. This remains unsupported in the academic literature though.

Political philosopher Adam James Tebble argues that more open borders aid both the economic and institutional development of poorer migrant sending countries, contrary to proponents of "brain-drain" critiques of migration.

Push factors and pull factors

Push factors 
Push factors are reasons that push people away from their countries. Examples of push factors are:

 political fears 
 not enough jobs 
 few opportunities 
 natural disasters 
 wars 
 unhappy life 
 shortage of food 
 Insecurity 
 scarcity of land etc.

Pull factors 
Pull factors are reasons that pull people to other countries. Examples of pull factors are:

 A better way of life
 Chances of a job
 Improved living conditions
 Education
 Better housing
 Medical care
 Family links
 Religious freedom 
 Fertile land

See also
 Economic impact of immigration to Canada
 Immigration to the United States
 Economic impact of illegal immigration to the United States

References

Human migration
Demographic economics